List of some published works of Nikolay Bogolyubov in chronological order:

1924
N. N. Bogolyubov (1924). On the behavior of solutions of linear differential equations at infinity.

1934

1937
N. N. Bogoliubov and N. M. Krylov (1937). "La theorie generalie de la mesure dans son application a l'etude de systemes dynamiques de la mecanique non-lineaire" (in French). Ann. Math. II 38: 65–113.  Zbl. 16.86.

1945

1946
N. N. Bogoliubov (1946). "Kinetic Equations" (in Russian). Journal of Experimental and Theoretical Physics 16 (8): 691–702. 
N. N. Bogoliubov (1946). "Kinetic Equations" (in English). Journal of Physics 10 (3): 265–274.

1947
N. N. Bogoliubov, K. P. Gurov (1947). "Kinetic Equations in Quantum Mechanics" (in Russian). Journal of Experimental and Theoretical Physics 17 (7): 614–628. 
N. N. Bogoliubov (1947). "К теории сверхтекучести" (in Russian). Известия АН СССР, физика, 1947, 11, № 1, 77. 
N. N. Bogoliubov (1947). "On the Theory of Superfluidity" (in English). Journal of Physics 11 (1): 23–32.

1948
N. N. Bogoliubov (1948). "Equations of Hydrodynamics in Statistical Mechanics" (in Ukrainian). Sbornik Trudov Instituta Matematiki AN USSR 10: 41—59.

1949

N. N. Bogoliubov (1967—1970): Lectures on Quantum Statistics. Problems of Statistical Mechanics of Quantum Systems. New York, Gordon and Breach.

1955

1957

 (1st edition)
 (3rd edition)
N. N. Bogoliubov, O. S. Parasyuk (1957). "Uber die Multiplikation der Kausalfunktionen in der Quantentheorie der Felder" (in German). Acta Mathematica 97: 227–266. .

1958
N. N. Bogoliubov (1958). On a New Method in the Theory of Superconductivity. Journal of Experimental and Theoretical Physics 34 (1): 58.

1965
N. N. Bogolubov, B. V. Struminsky, A. N. Tavkhelidze (1965). On composite models in the theory of elementary particles. JINR Preprint D-1968, Dubna.

External link
Complete list

Mathematics-related lists
Bibliographies by writer